Ab Soru (also Romanized as Āb Sorū) is a village in Jaydasht Rural District, in the Central District of Firuzabad County, Fars Province, Iran. At the 2006 census, its population was 31, in 5 families.

References 

Populated places in Firuzabad County